US Pujols XIII are a French Rugby league club based in Pujols, Lot-et-Garonne in the south-west of France. The club plays in National Division 1. Home games are played at the Lacassagne Sports Complex.

History 
 see also Gifi Bias XIII

Founded in 2014 US Pujols XIII can trace their history back through former Rugby League club Gifi Bias XIII who moved from their former base in Bias relocating to Pujols and becoming US Pujols XIII. The new club didn't have too long to wait for their first silverware as in just their second season they won the National Division 2 title after beating Salses XIII in the final 38-22. The following season after accepting promotion they finished 3rd and reached the final where they beat Realmont XIII 26-23.

Club Honours 

 National Division 2 (1): 2015-16
 National Division 1 (1): 2016-17

See also 
 National Division 2
 Gifi Bias XIII

References

External links 

 

2014 establishments in France
French rugby league teams
Rugby clubs established in 2014